Koboko is a town in Northern Region of Uganda. It is the main municipal, administrative, and commercial centre of Koboko District. Koboko is also the hometown of former dictator Idi Amin who ruled Uganda between 1971 and 1979.

History
A farm in Koboko was the birthplace of former military officer and 3rd president of Uganda, Idi Amin.

Location
The coordinates of the town are 3°24'36.0"N, 30°57'36.0"E (Latitude:3.4100; Longitude:30.9600).

Population
In 2002, the national census estimated the population of Koboko at 29,730. In 2010, the Uganda Bureau of Statistics (UBOS) estimated the population at 48,200. In 2011, UBOS estimated the  mid-year population at 51,300. In 2014, the national population census put Koboko's population at 37,825.

Points of interest
The following points of interest lie within the town limits or close to the edges of town:
 headquarters of Koboko District administration
 offices of Koboko Town Council
 Koboko central market
 tripoint where the borders of Uganda, South Sudan, and the Democratic Republic of the Congo converge
 Vurra–Arua–Koboko–Oraba Road passes through town, in a south/north direction, intersecting with the Koboko–Yumbe–Moyo Road, in the center of Koboko.

Notable people
Idi Amin 3rd president of Uganda from 1971–1979. He is known as the Butcher of Uganda because of his influence
James Baba Ugandan politician
Evelyn Anite Ugandan politician and journalist

See also
Kakwa people

References

External links
 Koboko District Information Portal

Populated places in Northern Region, Uganda
Cities in the Great Rift Valley
Koboko District
Karamoja